The 1957 All-Ireland Senior Camogie Championship Final was the 26th All-Ireland Final and the deciding match of the 1957 All-Ireland Senior Camogie Championship, an inter-county camogie tournament for the top teams in Ireland.

Antrim led 2-1 to 0-2 at half-time but Dublin gradually wore them down, Bríd Reid scoring a last-minute winning goal after Eilish Campbell, Antrim's star player, had gone off injured.

References

All-Ireland Senior Camogie Championship Finals
Camogie
All-Ireland Senior Camogie Championship Final
All-Ireland Senior Camogie Championship Final
All-Ireland Senior Camogie Championship Final, 1957
Dublin county camogie team matches